"Something More" is a song written and recorded by American country music group Sugarland. It was released in April 2005 as the second single from their debut album Twice the Speed of Life. Like its predecessor "Baby Girl", "Something More" was a number 2 hit on the Hot Country Songs charts.

Music video
A music video was released for the song, directed by Paul Boyd. In the video, the members of Sugarland are seen driving down a dirt road in a Cadillac. It breaks down and they stand around the smoking vehicle performing the song, until a truck drives up, and Nettles alone hops into the back. Nettles continues hitch-hiking while on the dirt road, getting on a motorcycle and in a station wagon. Throughout this, scenes of Nettles on a beach at sunset are mixed in.

Chart performance

Year-end charts

Personnel
As listed in liner notes.
Tom Bukovac – electric guitar
Brandon Bush – organ
Kristian Bush – mandolin, background vocals
Dan Dugmore – pedal steel guitar
Kristen Hall – acoustic guitar, background vocals
Greg Morrow – drums
Jennifer Nettles – lead vocals
Glenn Worf – bass guitar

References

2005 singles
Sugarland songs
Mercury Nashville singles
Music videos directed by Paul Boyd
Songs written by Kristian Bush
Songs written by Jennifer Nettles
Songs written by Kristen Hall
Song recordings produced by Garth Fundis
2004 songs